Basil Peteinos was a senior Byzantine official under Emperor Constantine VII Porphyrogennetos, who led an abortive conspiracy against Romanos II in 961.

Biography
According to the account of John Skylitzes, which offers the most details on his life, Basil Peteinos was a childhood friend and confidant of Constantine VII Porphyrogennetos. Indeed, on 20 December 944, Romanos I was deposed and banished to a monastery, but within weeks, the two Lekapenoi brothers were outmanoeuvred and sent to join their father by Constantine VII, who now became sole emperor.

The history of Theophanes Continuatus claims that Peteinos conspired against Constantine VII as well, was discovered, and exiled, but this is incorrect.

While remaining loyal to Constantine VII throughout the latter's reign, after his death in 959, he led a conspiracy against Constantine's son and successor, Romanos II. The conspiracy apparently encompassed several leading members of the court, with the purpose of assassinating Romanos II and raising Peteinos to the throne instead. The plot was revealed in March 961 by one of the conspirators, leading to the arrest of all participants. Peteinos was spared the torture inflicted on the others, but they were all publicly humiliated by being paraded through the streets of Constantinople, before being tonsured and exiled. The others were pardoned by Romanos II, but Peteinos remained in banishment on the island of Prokonnesos until his death.

References

Sources
 

10th-century Byzantine people
10th-century deaths
Patricii
Magistroi
Prisoners and detainees of the Byzantine Empire
Byzantine prisoners and detainees
Constantine VII
Byzantine usurpers
Megaloi hetaireiarchai